Fri Norsk Scene was a theatre group consisting of Norwegian actors residing as refugees in Sweden during World War II. It was established in 1944, and was active until May 1945. The group was led by Halfdan Christensen. Among the theatre's productions were Ibsen's play The Master Builder, Bjørnson's Geografi og Kjærlighet and Arnulf Øverland's Venner.

References

Former theatres in Sweden
Cultural history of World War II
1944 establishments in Sweden
1945 disestablishments in Sweden